Myledaphus is a genus of Late Cretaceous cartilaginous fish whose fossils are known from Canada, the Midwest of the United States, Olmos Formation of the Difunta Group of Mexico, and the Beshtyubin and Bissekty Formations of Uzbekistan. Most taxonomic authories place the genus in the Rhinobatidae. Two species are known: Myledaphus bipartitus, the type species, and Myledaphus araucanus, named in 2019.

Fossils and age 
The most common remains of this fish are teeth and vertebra. A study performed on Myledaphus vertebra from Alberta in 2013 revealed that Myledaphus had an estimated maximum age of 16 years. This means that Myledaphus had a shorter lifespan than that of the modern common guitarfish, by a difference of 8 years.

See also 
 List of prehistoric cartilaginous fish

References

Further reading 
 Hunt, ReBecca K., Vincent L. Santucci and Jason Kenworthy. 2006. "A preliminary inventory of fossil fish from National Park Service units." in S.G. Lucas, J.A. Spielmann, P.M. Hester, J.P. Kenworthy, and V.L. Santucci (ed.s), Fossils from Federal Lands. New Mexico Museum of Natural History and Science Bulletin 34, pp. 63–69.

Prehistoric cartilaginous fish genera
Cretaceous cartilaginous fish
Cretaceous fish of Asia
Fossils of Uzbekistan
Bissekty Formation
Cretaceous fish of North America
Fossils of the United States
Hell Creek fauna
Laramie Formation
Ojo Alamo Formation
Milk River Formation